Monilinia azaleae is a species of fungus in family Sclerotiniaceae. A plant pathogen, it was first formally described by Edwin Earle Honey in 1936.

References

Fungi described in 1936
Fungal plant pathogens and diseases
Sclerotiniaceae